Abstract Logic is the first collaborative live album by bassist Jonas Hellborg and guitarist Shawn Lane, released in 1995 through Day Eight Music; a remastered and remixed edition, containing a revised track listing and two extra tracks, was reissued through Bardo Records in 2004. For this lineup, they are joined by drummer Kofi Baker.

Critical reception

Robert Taylor at AllMusic gave Abstract Logic four stars out of five, calling it "a very good recording" but criticising Shawn Lane's guitar playing as inconsistent on the album. He praised Lane for sounding "positively demonic" and "demented, original and exciting" on some songs, but sounding too much like Allan Holdsworth on others.

Track listing

2004 remastered edition

Personnel
Jonas Hellborg – bass, production
Shawn Lane – vocals, guitar, keyboard
Kofi Baker – drums
Stéphane Jean – engineering
Tim Hunt – mixing

References

External links
In Review: Hellborg/Lane "Abstract Logic" at Guitar Nine Records

Jonas Hellborg albums
Shawn Lane albums
1995 live albums
Collaborative albums